Transition frequency may refer to:
A characteristic of spectral lines
The frequency of the radiation associated with a transition between hyperfine structure energy states of an atom
Turnover frequency in enzymology